The 41st Panzergrenadier Brigade is a brigade of the German Army.

On April 1, 1991 the 41st Homeland Security Brigade was established at Eggesin in Mecklenburg-Vorpommern, from the former Land Forces of the National People's Army 9th Panzer Division. On 27 June 1991 the "Vorpommern" title was awarded. In 1995, it was reclassified as Mechanized Infantry Brigade 41. After the installation of the brigade staff in 2002, the headquarters company and Panzer Battalion 413 moved to the Ferdinand von Schill barracks in Torgelow.

From 1991 to 2006, the 414 Panzer Battalion was active at Spechtberg.

Current structure 

  41st Panzergrenadier Brigade (Panzergrenadierbrigade 41), in Neubrandenburg
  Staff and Signal Company 41st Panzergrenadier Brigade, in Neubrandenburg
  6th Reconnaissance Battalion (Aufklärungsbataillon 6), in Eutin with Fennek reconnaissance vehicles and KZO drones
  401st Panzergrenadier Battalion (Panzergrenadierbataillon 401), in Hagenow with Puma infantry fighting vehicles
  411th Panzergrenadier Battalion (Panzergrenadierbataillon 411), in Viereck with 44x Puma infantry fighting vehicles
  413th Jäger Battalion (Jägerbataillon 413), in Torgelow with GTK Boxer armoured personnel carriers
  908th Panzergrenadier Battalion (Panzergrenadierbataillon 908), in Viereck (Reserve unit)
  803rd Panzer Engineer Battalion (Panzerpionierbataillon 803), in Havelberg
  142nd Supply Battalion (Versorgungsbataillon 142), in Hagenow

Brigades of the Bundeswehr
Military units and formations established in 1995